Dyschirius auriculatus is a species of ground beetle in the subfamily Scaritinae. It was described by Thomas Vernon Wollaston in 1867.

References

auriculatus
Beetles described in 1867